Samuel James Clark (born 18 October 1987) is an Australian actor, singer-songwriter, best known for his role as Ringo Brown on the Australian soap opera, Neighbours and Leo in the Fox/Paramount live musical television special Grease: Live. Clark made his musical debut in 2009 with the single "Broken", which peaked at number one on the Australian Physical Singles Chart His third single "Devastated" also peaked at number one on the same chart. In August 2010, Clark released his debut studio album, Take Me Home.

Early life
Clark was born in Adelaide. He is a graduate of St. Andrew's Primary School and St Peter's College, and was a keen participant in several high school theatre productions, including a main role in West Side Story. In 2006, Clark formed a group (originally a duo) called, Solid White Line with members, Jake Long and James Brown.

Acting career
Clark won the role of Ringo Brown after auditioning for a nationwide Dolly Magazine competition with Adelaide Kane; as the winner, he won a three-month contract with the show, which was later extended. Clark made his Neighbours debut on 24 January 2007. The character was actually three years younger than Clark's actual age. Clark went through a long audition process compared with other Neighbours cast members, as he had to audition four times. On entering the show, Clark described Ringo as a "good-hearted kid", who does the normal things that a 16-year-old kid does. For his portrayal of Ringo, Clark earned a nomination for the Logie Award for Most Popular New Male Talent.

In 2009, Clark took a three-month break from Neighbours to focus on his music career. He returned to filming in February 2010. That July, Clark announced that he would be leaving Neighbours in order to focus more on his music career. He said "I love acting and I'm definitely going to strive for further success in that part of my life, however music has always been a passion and I want to give it my all right now."

In 2012, Clark appeared in P. J. Hogan's Mental, alongside Toni Collette and Anthony LaPaglia. He also wrote four songs for the soundtrack.

In 2016, Clark made his U.S. television debut as Leo "Craterface" Balmudo in the Fox/Paramount live musical television special Grease: Live, alongside Vanessa Hudgens, Julianne Hough and Aaron Tveit under the direction of Tommy Kail (Hamilton).

Music career

2009–2010: Take Me Home

Since 2009, Clark has released his music through PLW Entertainment. "Broken" the debut single from Clark, was released in November 2009 The single peaked at number thirty nine on the ARIA Singles Chart It has had a better impact on other charts where it peaked at number one on the Australian Physical Singles Chart and at number eleven on the Australian Singles Charts (chart only for Australian origin) The second single, "Send Me a Sign" was released on 22 April 2010 and first premiered during an episode of Neighbours, where Clark sang it in character as Ringo Brown. The single failed to make an impact on the charts and had no physical release.

In July 2010, Clark released his third single, "Devastated" which debuted at number one on the Australian Physical Singles Chart. This single included the bonus track of "Suddenly", Clark's modern take on the original song by Angry Anderson, which was played in an episode of Neighbours during his character's (Ringo Brown) wedding to Donna Freedman (Margot Robbie). In August 2010, Clark began a five-week national tour across Australia, visiting fifty schools to promote the single and to also talk about his commitment to giving blood as an ambassador for the Red Cross Blood Service. Clark's debut album Take Me Home was released on 20 August

2011–present: My Own Way
In November 2011, Clark made his first independent release with EP My Own Way. He described the sound as "more folk and acoustic". The following year, he made an appearance at Bents Park as part of the South Tyneside Summer Festival concerts, alongside Matt Cardle and Ryan O'Shaughnessy.

Discography

Studio albums

Extended plays

Singles

Music videos

Filmography

Awards and nominations

References

External links

 
 
 Sam Clark on SoundCloud

1987 births
Living people
Male actors from Adelaide
Australian singer-songwriters
Australian male soap opera actors
Musicians from Adelaide
People educated at St Peter's College, Adelaide
21st-century Australian singers
21st-century Australian male singers
Australian male singer-songwriters
Australian expatriate male actors in the United States